Expatriape is the first album by Hairy Apes BMX released 1999.

Musicians
 Mike Dillon - vibraphone, percussion, vocals
 Zac Baird - keyboards, vocals
 John Speice - drums, percussion
 J.J. Richards - bass, vocals

Guest musicians
 David Carroll - congas (tracks 2, 3)
 DJ Nature - turntable (track 1)
 Skerik - saxophone (tracks 5, 8)
 Joe Cripps - congas (track 1)

Tracks
Relapse King (Dillon, HABMX)
$100 (Dillon, Quinn)
Her Smile Unloads (Baird)
Jimmy Hat (Richards)
Fang (HABMX)
Situboquita Fuera (Cumbia)
My Tribe (Dillon)
Millennium Madness (Hooten, HABMX)
Breakfast (Dillon)

References

 Liner notes

1999 albums
Hairy Apes BMX albums